Hungary sent a delegation to compete at the 2018 Winter Paralympics, in Pyeongchang. It fielded a total of two athletes (one man and one woman).

Alpine skiing

Men

References

Nations at the 2018 Winter Paralympics
Paralympics
2018